Corey Thomas Carrier (born August 20, 1980) is an American former child actor, also known as just "Core". He is best known as playing Indiana Jones, aged 8–10, in The Young Indiana Jones Chronicles.

Carrier was born in Middleborough, Massachusetts to Thomas and Carleen. He has a younger sister named Bethany. He attended an acting school at The Priscilla Beach Children's Theatre Workshop. When he was a child, his hobbies included baseball, gymnastics, wrestling, fencing, guitar, ice skating and basketball.

He attended Clark University in Worcester, Massachusetts as an undergraduate.

Filmography

Film

Television

References

External links 
 

1980 births
American male child actors
American male film actors
American male television actors
Clark University alumni
Living people
People from Middleborough, Massachusetts
20th-century American male actors